This article is a list of venues for the National Ploughing Championships, an agricultural fair held annually in the Republic of Ireland since 1931.

References

National Ploughing Championships